Alexandra Dominique Houghton Gonzales (born February 23, 2000), better known by her screen name Lexi Gonzales, is a Filipino actress, dancer, singer, model and host. She is notable for her participations in reality shows such as StarStruck and Running Man Philippines.

Discography

Single

Original soundtracks

Filmography

Film

Television series

Television show

Web series

References

External links
 

2000 births
Living people
People from Sampaloc, Manila
Actresses from Manila
Participants in Philippine reality television series
StarStruck (Philippine TV series) participants
GMA Network personalities
Filipino television variety show hosts
Filipino female models
Filipino women pop singers
Filipino television actresses
Filipino film actresses
Filipino people of American descent